Bastion of Faith is an accessory for the 2nd edition of the Advanced Dungeons & Dragons fantasy role-playing game, published in 2000.

Contents
Bastion of Faith is the third in a series of books that detail one of the four core character classes, after College of Wizardry for mages and Den of Thieves for rogues. This book gives the priest a home, patrons, friends and allies to aid his cause. The Bastion is the name for the Church of Heironeous.

Bastion of Faith details the upper levels of power in the priesthood and gives a summary of the different members of the church, noting where some of these levels have places that player characters might fit in. Thieves who worship Heironeous are called inquisitors, fighters are templars, and mages are catechists, and the faithful gain spell-like abilities as they rise in level. In addition to the roster, there are fourteen full write ups that include history, personality, statistics, possessions, and illustrations. The book also introduces favors, which are a form of paper money.

Publication history
Bastion of Faith was published by Wizards of the Coast, and written by Bruce R. Cordell.

Reception
Bastion of Faith was reviewed by the online version of Pyramid on June 16, 2000. The reviewer says that regarding the actual Bastion described, this book "gives the DM enough details to choke a horse". The reviewer also comments on the summary of church members: "One of the nice things about the roster is that there are several 1st level characters with names that a GM can just scoop up and use as player characters. Not a priest? That's fine."

References

Dungeons & Dragons sourcebooks
Role-playing game supplements introduced in 2000